Igney may refer to the following places in France:

 Igney, Meurthe-et-Moselle, a commune in the Meurthe-et-Moselle department
 Igney, Vosges, a commune in the Vosges department